Siavash is an Iranian Drama Series. The series is directed by Soroush Mohammadzadeh. Production of the series began before the outbreak of the COVID-19, and most of the filming days continued during the COVID-19 days.

Storyline 
Siavash Saghi (Milad KeyMaram) is a wrestler and world champion and his fiancé Marjan needs a liver transplant. Siavash goes to Nosrat (Reza Kianian), one of the billionaires, due to his financial inability to pay for his fiancé's surgery. But in exchange for giving money to Siavash, Nosrat asks him to marry his daughter Maral (Tarlan Parvaneh).

Cast 
 Milad KeyMaram
 Reza Kianian
 Alireza Jafari
 Majid Salehi
 Tarlan Parvaneh
 Mohammadreza Solati
 Sogol Khaligh
 Mohammad Valizadegan
 Khosro Shahraz
 Giti Ghasemi
 Mehdi Hosseininia
 Nahid Moslemi
 Yadollah Shademani
 Roya Javidnia
 Elham Jedi
 Mahsa Bagheri

References

External links
 
 Siavash at Namava
 Siavash at Official website

2010s Iranian television series
Iranian television series